BIGBANK Tartu is an Estonian professional volleyball club based in Tartu, Estonia, that competes in the  Baltic Men Volleyball League.

Founded in 1999, the team has won 4 Baltic League championships, 5 Estonian League championships and 4 Estonian Cups.

The team plays its home games at University of Tartu Sports Hall.

History
The team was founded 1999 as Pere Leib Tartu. Before that Tartu volleyball was represented by Ösel Foods Tartu, who had won the Estonian League in 1998 and 1999. Pere Leib Tartu was founded by two former Ösel Foods players, Raivo Simson and Alari Jõesaar. 

Pere Leib Tartu won another Estonian League title in 2006, defeating Selver/Audentes 2–0 in the finals. The team won their first Estonian Cup in the same season. Pere Leib Tartu won another Estonian Cup in 2008–09. 

The 2006–07 season was historical as Pere Leib Tartu made their European debut when they held the CEV Top Teams Cup tournament.

In 2011–12, the club won second Estonian League title and also their first ever Baltic League title by defeating the defending champions Selver Tallinn in the finals. In 2012, the team changed their name to BIGBANK Tartu for sponsorship reasons. First title under the new name came in 2014, when the club won their third Estonian League championship.

In 2014–15, BIGBANK Tartu won their second Baltic League title.

Team roster

2021/2022

Season by season

Honours
Baltic League
 Winners (4): 2012, 2015, 2019, 2022
 Runners-up: 2006, 2008, 2009, 2010, 2014

Estonian League
 Winners (5): 2006, 2012, 2014, 2021, 2022
 Runners-up: 2000, 2001, 2002, 2003, 2005, 2007, 2008, 2009, 2011, 2015, 2017, 2018, 2019

Baltic Cup
 Winners (2): 2003, 2004
 Runners-up: 2006

Estonian Cup
 Winners (4): 2005, 2008, 2019, 2021
 Runners-up: 1999, 2000, 2001, 2002, 2003, 2006, 2007, 2011, 2013, 2017, 2020

Head coaches
1999–2001  Andres Toode
2001–2005  Alar Kaljuvee
2005–2008  Urmas Tali
2008–2009  Oliver Taats
2009–2012  Rainer Vassiljev
2012–2015  Andrei Ojamets
2015–2018   Oliver Lüütsepp
2018–2020   Andrei Ojamets
2020–   Alar Rikberg

Notable players
  Martti Juhkami 
  Kristo Kollo (7 seasons: 2007–2012; 2013–2015)
  Argo Meresaar (4 seasons: 2005–2007; 2013–2015)
  Jaanus Nõmmsalu (1 season: 2007–2008)
  Hindrek Pulk (1 season: 2018–2019)
  Rait Rikberg 
  Janis Sirelpuu (3 seasons: 2000–2003)
  Rauno Tamme (2 seasons: 2009–2011)
  Renee Teppan (2 seasons: 2012–2014)
  Andres Toobal (4 seasons: 2009–2011; 2012–2014)
  Kert Toobal 
  Henri Treial (4 seasons: 2012–2016)
  Robert Täht (3 seasons: 2012–2015)
  Oliver Venno (3 seasons: 2006–2009)

References

External links
 Official website 
 Estonian Volleyball Federation 
 FIVB
 CEV

Estonian volleyball clubs
Sport in Tartu
Volleyball clubs established in 1999
1999 establishments in Estonia